The DL postcode area, also known as the Darlington postcode area, is a group of seventeen postcode districts in England, which are subdivisions of fourteen post towns. These districts cover central County Durham (including Darlington, Bishop Auckland, Ferryhill, Crook, Spennymoor, Shildon, Barnard Castle and Newton Aycliffe), northern North Yorkshire (including Northallerton, Bedale, Hawes, Leyburn, Richmond and Catterick Garrison) and a very small part of Cumbria.



Coverage
The approximate coverage of the postcode districts:

|-
! DL1
| DARLINGTON
| Darlington (east)
| Darlington
|-
! DL2
| DARLINGTON
| Staindrop, Gainford, Darlington new estates
| County Durham, Darlington
|-
! DL3
| DARLINGTON
| Darlington (west), Faverdale, Coatham Mundeville
| Darlington
|-
! DL4
| SHILDON
| Shildon
| County Durham
|-
! DL5
| NEWTON AYCLIFFE
| Newton Aycliffe, Heighington
| County Durham
|-
! DL6
| NORTHALLERTON
| Northallerton (east), Ingleby Cross
| Hambleton
|-
! DL7
| NORTHALLERTON
| Northallerton (west), Romanby, Leeming Bar
| Hambleton
|-
!rowspan=3|DL8
| BEDALE
| Bedale
| Hambleton
|-
| HAWES
| Hawes
| Richmondshire
|-
| LEYBURN
| Coverham, Leyburn, Middleham
| Richmondshire
|-
! DL9
| CATTERICK GARRISON
| Catterick Garrison
| Richmondshire
|-
! DL10
| RICHMOND
| Richmond, Catterick, Brompton-upon-Swale, Scotch Corner
| Richmondshire
|-
! DL11
| RICHMOND
| Swaledale, Reeth, Low Row, Arkengarthdale
| Richmondshire, Eden
|-
! DL12
| BARNARD CASTLE
| Barnard Castle, Bowes, Middleton-in-Teesdale
| County Durham
|-
! DL13
| BISHOP AUCKLAND
| Stanhope, Frosterley, Wolsingham, Tow Law
| County Durham, Eden
|-
! DL14
| BISHOP AUCKLAND
| Bishop Auckland, Evenwood
| County Durham
|-
! DL15
| CROOK
| Crook, Willington
| County Durham
|-
! DL16
| SPENNYMOOR
| Spennymoor
| County Durham
|-
! style="background:#FFFFFF;"|DL16
| style="background:#FFFFFF;"|FERRYHILL
| style="background:#FFFFFF;"|
| style="background:#FFFFFF;"|non-geographic
|-
! DL17
| FERRYHILL
| Ferryhill, Chilton, Cornforth, Bishop Middleham
| County Durham
|-
! style="background:#FFFFFF;"|DL98
| style="background:#FFFFFF;"|DARLINGTON
| style="background:#FFFFFF;"|
| style="background:#FFFFFF;"|non-geographic
|}

Map

See also
List of postcode areas in the United Kingdom
Postcode Address File

References

External links
Royal Mail's Postcode Address File
A quick introduction to Royal Mail's Postcode Address File (PAF)

Postcode areas covering North East England
Postcode areas covering Yorkshire and the Humber
Borough of Darlington